Fremantle Hospital is an Australian public hospital situated on South Terrace in central Fremantle, southwest of Perth, Western Australia.

It was formerly the major hospital in its region; however, with the opening of Fiona Stanley Hospital in Murdoch on 3 February 2015, it was substantially downsized, with the closure of its emergency department and a range of other services being relocated to the new hospital.

Location
The main facility of Fremantle hospital is a historic site and looks out over the nearby fishing boat harbour, the Port of Fremantle and the Indian Ocean.

The western side is bounded by South Terrace, while Hampton Road is on its eastern side.

The hospital is also within walking distance of the Fremantle Markets, and Fremantle Oval.

History

Fremantle Public Hospital opened in 1897 with 52 beds. The building itself was originally a private residence, "The Knowle", built in 1856 with both stone and labour from Fremantle Prison.

Two extra wards and an operating theatre were added in 1900. Subsequent additions included the Ron Doig Block in 1934, the William Wauhop Wing in 1960, the Princess of Wales Wing in 1976.

Prior to the opening of Fiona Stanley Hospital, Fremantle Hospital and Health Service provided 575 beds across all campuses, which included Rottnest Island Nursing Post and Kayeela Hospital in East Fremantle. Facilities included 24-hour acute care, emergency department, a paediatric ward, a 66-bed psychiatric and psychogeriatric service. The Hyperbaric Medicine Unit has provided support services for divers in all of Western Australia and clinical services to residents mainly from the immediate area for over 20 years.

With the opening of Fiona Stanley Hospital, Fremantle Hospital has become a 300-bed hospital focused on services such as mental health, aged care, secondary rehabilitation, palliative care, and planned surgeries. The Kaleeya campus was closed, with the land sold in December 2014; the Rottnest Island Nursing Post was made an external campus of Fiona Stanley Hospital.

See also
 List of hospitals in Australia

Notes

External links
 

South Terrace, Fremantle
Hampton Road, Fremantle
Teaching hospitals in Australia
Hospitals in Perth, Western Australia
Buildings and structures in Fremantle
Hospitals established in 1897
1897 establishments in Australia